Count Five was an American garage rock band, formed in San Jose, California in 1964, known for their hit single "Psychotic Reaction".

Background
The band was founded in 1964 by lead guitarist John "Mouse" Michalski (born 1948, Cleveland, Ohio) and bassist Roy Chaney (born 1948, Indianapolis, Indiana). The two were high school friends who had previously played in several short-lived bands, most notably a surf rock group named The Citations. As the British Invasion's influence took effect, the band changed in musical direction. After going by the name The Squires for a short time, along with several line-up changes, the Count Five was born. John "Sean" Byrne (1947–2008, born Dublin, Ireland) played rhythm guitar and performed lead vocals; Kenn Ellner played tambourine and harmonica, while sharing lead vocals; and Craig "Butch" Atkinson (1947–1998, born San Jose, California) played drums. The Count Five were recognizable for their habit of wearing Count Dracula-style capes when playing live.

"Psychotic Reaction", an acknowledged cornerstone of garage rock, was initially devised by Byrne, with the group refining it and turning it into the highlight of their live sets. The song was influenced by the style of contemporary musicians such as The Standells and The Yardbirds. The band was rejected by several record labels before they got signed to the Los Angeles-based Double Shot Records. "Psychotic Reaction" was released as a single, peaking at number five in the U.S. charts in late 1966. The band enjoyed limited success for a short time, dropping out of view altogether when their only hit had fallen from public memory. Another setback to a potential career in the music business was the decision of four of the five members (who at that time were between the ages of 17 and 22) to pursue college degrees. Several months before the retirement of the band, David Eugene McDowell, the youngest player at 17, hooked up with the group as a guitar player for their last several months as a band. He went on to join up with Billy Nix and the Ideals as their bass player.

By 1969, the Count Five had broken up, but their memory was immortalized in a 1971 essay by rock journalist Lester Bangs, entitled "Psychotic Reactions and Carburetor Dung." In the essay, Bangs credited the band for having released several later albums (after Psychotic Reaction): Carburetor Dung, Cartesian Jetstream, Ancient Lace and Wrought-Iron Railings, and Snowflakes Falling On the International Dateline — each displaying an increasing sense of artistry and refinement. However, none of these subsequent albums actually existed except in Bangs' own imagination.

The Count Five reunited only once, when they performed a concert on April 11, 1987, at a club in Santa Clara, California called "One Step Beyond". This performance has been released as Psychotic Reunion LIVE!.

The song "Psychotic Reaction" can be heard playing on the jukebox in an early scene in Wim Wenders' film Alice in the Cities (1974) and in the party scene in The Sense of an Ending (2017). It can also be heard on the season one finale of the HBO drama series Vinyl. It was also included on the 1972 compilation album Nuggets: Original Artyfacts from the First Psychedelic Era, 1965-1968.

Craig Atkinson died on Tuesday, October 13, 1998. John Byrne died on Monday, December 15, 2008, at 61 from cirrhosis of the liver.

Roy Chaney formed a new band in the 1990s called The Count, with Byrne and drummer Rocco Astrella (March 20, 1951 – March 1, 2014), who played in the last version of the original group. The Count released their debut CD, Can't Sleep, in 2002. In 2006, Count Five was among the first bands inaugurated into the San Jose Rock Hall of Fame.

Members 
 John "Sean" Byrne – lead vocals, rhythm guitar (died 2008)
 Kenn Ellner – backing and lead vocals, tambourine, harmonica
 John "Mouse" Michalski – lead guitar
 Roy Chaney – bass guitar
 Craig "Butch" Atkinson – drums (died 1998)
 David "Dave" Eugene McDowell lead guitar;  last and youngest member (born 1952)

Discography

Studio album 
 Psychotic Reaction (1966) US # 122

Compilations 
 Dynamite Incidents (1983)
 Psychotic Reaction (1987)
 Rarities: The Double Shot Years (2014)

Live album 
 Psychotic Reunion LIVE! (1987)

Singles 
 "Psychotic Reaction" / "They're Gonna Get You" (1966) US # 5
 "Peace of Mind" / "The Morning After" (1966) US # 125
 "You Must Believe Me" / "Teeny Bopper, Teeny Bopper" (1967)
 "Merry-Go-Round" / "Contrast" (1967)
 "Revelation in Slow Motion" / "Declaration of Independence" (1968)
 "Mailman" / "Pretty Big Mouth" (1969)

References

External links
  Official Website
 Information about Count Five
 Profile of Count V
 John "Sean" Byrne Obituary

 
Acid rock music groups
Apex Records artists
Garage rock groups from California
Musical groups established in 1964
Musical groups from San Jose, California
Psychedelic rock music groups from California